Gustavo González (born 25 June 1953) is an Argentine former swimmer. He competed in four events at the 1972 Summer Olympics.

References

1953 births
Living people
Argentine male swimmers
Olympic swimmers of Argentina
Swimmers at the 1972 Summer Olympics
Place of birth missing (living people)
20th-century Argentine people